For the results of the São Paulo state football team, see:
 São Paulo state football team results (1901–1950)
 São Paulo state football team results (1951–2010)